Phillips Park may refer to:

 Phillips Park (Aurora, Illinois)
 Phillips Park (Pittsburgh)